Podisus is a genus of predatory stink bugs in the family Pentatomidae. There are at least 20 described species in Podisus.

Species
These 20 species belong to the genus Podisus:

 Podisus aenescens (Stål, 1860)
 Podisus australis Berg, 1879
 Podisus borinquensis Barber
 Podisus brevispinus Phillips, 1982
 Podisus distinctus (Stål, 1860)
 Podisus fretus Olsen, 1916
 Podisus fuscescens (Dallas, 1851)
 Podisus gillettei Uhler
 Podisus jole (Stål, 1862)
 Podisus maculiventris (Say, 1832) (spined soldier bug)
 Podisus modestus (Dallas, 1851)
 Podisus mucronatus Uhler, 1897
 Podisus neglectus
 Podisus nigrispinus (Dallas, 1851)
 Podisus placidus Uhler, 1870
 Podisus sagitta (Fabricius, 1794)
 Podisus serieventris Uhler, 1871
 Podisus sigitta (Fabricius, 1794)
 Podisus subferrugineus Barber & Bruner
 Podisus vittipennis Herrich-Schaeffer, 1851

References

Further reading

External links

 

Asopinae
Pentatomidae genera
Articles created by Qbugbot